Luiz Bento Palamone (born 21 March 1898, date of death unknown) was a Brazilian footballer. He played in seven matches for the Brazil national football team from 1919 to 1922. He was also part of Brazil's squad for the 1919 South American Championship.

References

External links
 

1898 births
Year of death missing
Brazilian footballers
Brazil international footballers
Place of birth missing
Association footballers not categorized by position